Backpropagation through time (BPTT) is a gradient-based technique for training certain types of recurrent neural networks. It can be used to train Elman networks. The algorithm was independently derived by numerous researchers.

Algorithm

The training data for a recurrent neural network is an ordered sequence of  input-output pairs, . An initial value must be specified for the hidden state . Typically, a vector of all zeros is used for this purpose.

BPTT begins by unfolding a recurrent neural network in time. The unfolded network contains  inputs and outputs, but every copy of the network shares the same parameters. Then the backpropagation algorithm is used to find the gradient of the cost with respect to all the network parameters.

Consider an example of a neural network that contains a recurrent layer  and a feedforward layer . There are different ways to define the training cost, but the aggregated cost is always the average of the costs of each of the time steps. The cost of each time step can be computed separately. The figure above shows how the cost at time  can be computed, by unfolding the recurrent layer  for three time steps and adding the feedforward layer . Thus the weight updates in each instance are summed together.

Pseudocode
Pseudocode for a truncated version of BPTT, where the training data contains  input-output pairs, but the network is unfolded for  time steps:

 Back_Propagation_Through_Time(a, y)   // a[t] is the input at time t. y[t] is the output
     Unfold the network to contain k instances of f
     do until stopping criterion is met:
         x := the zero-magnitude vector // x is the current context
         for t from 0 to n − k do      // t is time. n is the length of the training sequence
             Set the network inputs to x, a[t], a[t+1], ..., a[t+k−1]
             p := forward-propagate the inputs over the whole unfolded network
             e := y[t+k] − p;           // error = target − prediction
             Back-propagate the error, e, back across the whole unfolded network
             Sum the weight changes in the k instances of f together.
             Update all the weights in f and g.
             x := f(x, a[t]);           // compute the context for the next time-step

Advantages
BPTT tends to be significantly faster for training recurrent neural networks than general-purpose optimization techniques such as evolutionary optimization.

Disadvantages
BPTT has difficulty with local optima. With recurrent neural networks, local optima are a much more significant problem than with feed-forward neural networks. The recurrent feedback in such networks tends to create chaotic responses in the error surface which cause local optima to occur frequently, and in poor locations on the error surface.

See also 
 Backpropagation through structure

References

Artificial neural networks